Freddie Fields (July 12, 1923 – December 11, 2007), born Fred Feldman, was an American theatrical agent and film producer.

Biography
Born to a Jewish family, Fields was the brother of band leader Shep Fields.

Fields and partner David Begelman founded the international talent agency Creative Management Associates (CMA). At CMA, Fields and Begelman pioneered the movie "package", where the talent agency put their stars, directors and writers together on a single project.

CMA developed numerous agents including Sue Mengers, Mike Medavoy, Sam Cohn, and Jeff Berg (who became president in 1979).   CMA was instrumental in the development of such stars as Judy Garland, Woody Allen, Henry Fonda, Marilyn Monroe, Robert Redford, Peter Sellers, Steve McQueen and later Steven Spielberg, George Lucas, Burt Bacharach, Neil Young, and Jack Carter, and into the 1980s promoted the likes of Richard Gere and Mel Gibson. While at CMA, he was involved with numerous blockbuster films including Butch Cassidy and the Sundance Kid, American Graffiti and Star Wars. Fields played a key role in the merger of CMA with the International Famous Agency to form International Creative Management (ICM).

Fields was a partner in the First Artists Company with Paul Newman, Steve McQueen, Dustin Hoffman, Sidney Poitier, and Barbra Streisand. While First Artists only lasted for five years, it was unique in that it owned the films it produced, such as The Getaway (1972).

He later served as president of MGM and United Artists.

Personal life
Fields was married four times. He was survived by his wife, former Miss Universe 1964, Corinna Tsopei, and by two adopted children by his former wife, actress Polly Bergen. He also was married to actress Edith Fellows, who died June 26, 2011. Kathy Fields is their child.

Filmography
He was a producer in all films unless otherwise noted.

Film

Miscellaneous crew

Television

References

External links

 
 
 
 

1923 births
2007 deaths
20th-century American Jews
Burials at Westwood Village Memorial Park Cemetery
Deaths from lung cancer in California
American talent agents
21st-century American Jews